Hippuristanol is a small molecule found in the coral Isis hippuris which was discovered by Jerry Pelletier  and others of McGill University in Montreal, Quebec, Canada.  It appears to have anti-viral activity and may hold promise as a cancer therapy. Binds to and inhibits the eukaryotic translation initiation factor protein eIF4A.

See also
Eukaryotic translation
eIF4A

References 

Steroids